Flic-en-Flac is a seaside village on the west coast of Mauritius in the district of Black River.

The name most likely comes from an Old Dutch phrase, "Fried Landt Flaak", meaning free, flat land. Its public white sandy beach is one of the longest on the island. This public beach attracts local families, tourists and visitors throughout the year. Its lagoon is protected by the surrounding coral reefs. The beach provides scenic views over the Indian Ocean horizon and of Le Morne Brabant Peninsula located in the south west of Mauritius. Flic-en-Flac is near Tamarin beach which is situated a few kilometres away. The Casela Bird Park near Flic-en-Flac features orchids, over 140 species of birds and the endemic and endangered rare pink pigeon.

It is geared towards tourism with many luxury hotels in Mauritius, experiencing about 500,000 visitors yearly. The town has River Rempart to its south, a La Ferme Reservoir to its northeast, and a groundwater flow which provides freshwater spring to marshes and lagoons near the town.

The beach erosion and corals near Flic-en-Flac have been the subject of several studies on global climate change. The Mauritius government has built gabions to address this erosion, but the subsequent tidal damage has raised concerns about its quality and stability.

Flic-en-Flac offers a lively atmosphere both during day and night. Visitors can try the delicious street food during the day, such as the "DhalPuri", which is a flat multi-layered thin nan-bread-like made essentially with flour, yellow split peas, salt and water with some flavoursome curry and sauces wrapped in. Other famous food that visitors can experience is also the fried noodles with Mauritian meatballs, also another famous dish among the locals. In saying that, visitors from other countries may not be used to the water and local food, so extreme cautious is to be observed in order to avoid any food poisoning or stomach sickness.

On the weekend, a lot of locals go to the beach to spend the day with their families and friends, which is a source of entertainment in itself as some of the locals tend to sing and dance to the typical Sega music, music that is mostly played with guitars and "ravannes", a lookalike of the "Bodhrán", but played differently and with hands.

The nightlife is very vibrant as a lot of locals and tourists tend to go out to the nightclubs and restaurants to enjoy the night and meet people. All in all, Flic-en-Flac provides an all-round experience, except for the beautiful white sandy beach that has a fair bit of corals and sea urchins.

See also

 Île aux Cerfs
 La Pirogue
 List of places in Mauritius
 Rivière Noire District

References

Beaches of Mauritius
Populated places in Mauritius